What He Forgot is a 1915 American comedy film featuring Oliver Hardy.

Plot

Cast
 Jerold T. Hevener as Bill Bailey
 Mae Hotely as Bella Bailey
 Eloise Willard as Her Mother
 George T. Welsh as Her Father
 Royal Byron as Jack
 Nellie Farron as An Actress
 Oliver Hardy (as Babe Hardy)

See also
 List of American films of 1915
 Filmography of Oliver Hardy

External links

1915 films
1915 short films
American silent short films
American black-and-white films
1915 comedy films
Silent American comedy films
Lubin Manufacturing Company films
American comedy short films
Films directed by Jerold T. Hevener
1910s American films